Você Nem Imagina (Portuguese for You Can't Even Imagine) is a compilation album by Brazilian band Fellini. It was released on December 6, 2010, by Fonomatic, a subsidiary of independent record label-distributor Tratore.  It features re-recordings of some of Fellini's previous songs, ranging from their 1985 debut album O Adeus de Fellini to 1990's Amor Louco. It is the band's last album before they broke up again.

The album's cover was illustrated by Cadão Volpato.

The album's name is a reference to a verse on Fellini's song "Rock Europeu".

Track listing
All lyrics by Cadão Volpato, all music composed by Jair Marcos, Thomas Pappon, Ricardo Salvagni and Cadão Volpato

Personnel
Fellini
 Cadão Volpato — vocals
 Jair Marcos — guitar, backing vocals
 Ricardo Salvagni — bass
 Thomas Pappon — guitar, backing vocals

Guest musicians
 Clayton Martins — drum

 Miscellaneous staff
Recorded by Rainer Pappon Studio in Paris, São Paulo, on August 21, 2009
Mixed by Thomas Pappon in Sunray Garage, London, October / November 2009
Produced by Thomas Pappon and Fellini

References

External links
 Você Nem Imagina at Fellini's official Bandcamp
 Você Nem Imagina at Deezer
 Você Nem Imagina at Tratore's official website 
 Você Nem Imagina at Rate Your Music
 All tracks of the album available for listening 

2010 compilation albums
2010 greatest hits albums
Fellini (band) albums
Portuguese-language compilation albums